Christina Putigna (born 16 October 1997) is a Canadian ice hockey forward, currently playing for the Boston Pride of the National Women's Hockey League (NWHL). She currently holds the record for most points scored by a Canadian player in a single NWHL season.

Playing career 
During high school, Putigna played two years for Blessed Trinity Catholic Secondary School in her hometown of Grimsby, Ontario, in addition to playing with the Stoney Creek Sabres and then Oakville Hornets in the Provincial Women's Hockey League (PWHL).

Across 135 NCAA games with the Providence Friars from 2015 to 2019, she scored 110 points, good for ninth all-time in program history. She scored 28 points in 38 games in her rookie collegiate season, finishing second on her team in scoring, third among all Hockey East rookies in scoring, and being named to the Hockey East All-Rookie Team. She scored a career-high 30 points in 33 games in her senior year, including her 100th NCAA point on 8 February 2019 against Maine.

Putigna was drafted by the Boston Pride in 2019 and signed her first professional contract with the team. As a rookie fixture playing on Boston's top line with Jillian Dempsey and McKenna Brand she finished 6th in the NWHL with 29 points, first among rookies as the Pride made it to the Isobel Cup finals before the season was cancelled due to the COVID-19 pandemic. She was selected as a forward to the 2020 NWHL All Star game, held in Boston. During the season, she was responsible for producing content for the team's TikTok page, along with fellow rookie Tori Sullivan.

She was re-signed by the Pride on 9 April 2020, the first player to be signed by the Pride for the 2020–21 season.

International career 
Putigna represented Canada at the U22 Summer Series against the United States in 2016. She was also selected to participate in the 2016 and 2017 Hockey Canada's National Women's Program Strength and Conditioning Camps. She has yet to make an appearance for the senior national team.

Personal life 
Putigna has a degree in Health Policy and Management from Providence College.

Career stats

Sources:

Honours 
2015–2016 Hockey East Rookie of the Month for November
2015–2016 Hockey East All-Rookie Team
2017–2018 Two Time Hockey East Top Performer 
2018–2019 Hockey East All-Tournament Team
2019–2020 NWHL All Star Team
Source:

References

External links
 
 
 

1997 births
Living people
People from Grimsby, Ontario
Ice hockey people from Ontario
Canadian women's ice hockey forwards
Boston Pride players
Providence Friars women's ice hockey players
Premier Hockey Federation players